Thedu  is a 2020 Tamil language film directed by Eeshwar. The film stars Santhosh Sanjay, Meghana, and Sivakasi Murugesan.

Cast 
 Santhosh Sanjay
 Meghna
 Sivakasi Murugesan 
 Kamaraj
 Rani

Production 
This is the second film of director Eeshwar after Inaya Thalaimurai (2016). Sanjay, who has performed negative roles, debuts as a hero in this film. Meghana, who was last seen in Uruthikol (2017), plays his love interest. Sivakasi Murugesan became a producer with this film and also plays the antagonist.

Release 
The Times of India gave the film one out of five stars and wrote that "One wonders why films like Thedu are made as it doesn’t have a aspect which is worth holding the attention of viewers".. "cinematography" using live lights and done the Job very well by using simple equipments what he have from production side.... A reviewer from Maalai Malar gave the film a negative review.

References

External links 
 

2020 films
2020s Telugu-language films